Phlegmacium ochribubalinum is a species of fungus in the family Cortinariaceae.

Taxonomy 
The species was described in 2014 and classified as Cortinarius ochribubalinus. It was placed in the subgenus Phlegmacium of the large mushroom genus Cortinarius.

In 2022 the species was transferred from Cortinarius and reclassified as Phlegmacium ochribubalinum based on genomic data.

Etymology 
The specific epithet ochribubalinum refers to the ochre colour of the fruitbodies.

Habitat and distribution 
Found in South Finland, where it grows on the ground with deciduous trees.

References

External links

Cortinariaceae
Fungi described in 2014
Fungi of Finland